In the 2014–15 season, Espérance Sportive de Tunis competed in the Ligue 1 for the 60th season, as well as the Tunisian Cup.  It was their 60th consecutive season in the top flight of Tunisian football. They competed in Ligue 1, the Champions League, the Confederation Cup and the Tunisian Cup.

Squad list
Players and squad numbers last updated on 15 November 2014.Note: Flags indicate national team as has been defined under FIFA eligibility rules. Players may hold more than one non-FIFA nationality.

Competitions

Overview

{| class="wikitable" style="text-align: center"
|-
!rowspan=2|Competition
!colspan=8|Record
!rowspan=2|Started round
!rowspan=2|Final position / round
!rowspan=2|First match	
!rowspan=2|Last match
|-
!
!
!
!
!
!
!
!
|-
| Ligue 1

|  
| 3rd
| 14 August 2014
| 31 May 2015
|-
| Tunisian Cup

| colspan=2| Round of 32
| colspan=2| 21 February 2015
|-
| 2014 Champions League

| colspan=2| Group stage
| 26 July 2014
| 24 August 2014
|-
| 2015 Champions League

| First round
| Second round
| 15 March 2015
| 3 May 2015
|-
| Confederation Cup

| colspan=2| Play-off round
| 17 May 2015
| 6 June 2015
|-
! Total

Ligue 1

League table

Results summary

Results by round

Matches

Tunisian Cup

2014 CAF Champions League

Group stage

Group B

2015 CAF Champions League

First round

Second round

CAF Confederation Cup

Play-off round

Squad information

Playing statistics

|-
! colspan=14 style=background:#dcdcdc; text-align:center| Goalkeepers

|-
! colspan=14 style=background:#dcdcdc; text-align:center| Defenders

|-
! colspan=14 style=background:#dcdcdc; text-align:center| Midfielders

|-
! colspan=14 style=background:#dcdcdc; text-align:center| Forwards

|-
! colspan=14 style=background:#dcdcdc; text-align:center| Players transferred out during the season

Goalscorers
Includes all competitive matches. The list is sorted alphabetically by surname when total goals are equal.

Transfers

In

Out

References 

2014-15
Tunisian football clubs 2014–15 season